Ermanno Capelli (born 9 May 1985 in Ponte San Pietro, Italy) is an Italian professional road racing cyclist, who last rode for UCI Continental team .

Palmares

2006
 3rd, National U23 Time Trial Championship
2007
 3rd, Milan–San Remo – U23 version

Notes and references

External links

Italian male cyclists
1985 births
Living people
Cyclists from the Province of Bergamo
People from Ponte San Pietro